The Shire of Jondaryan was a local government area located in the Darling Downs region of Queensland, Australia, immediately west of the regional city of Toowoomba. Its growth in later years has been fuelled by the expansion of Toowoomba and suburbs such as Glenvale and Westbrook.

History

Jondaryan Division was created on 11 November 1879 as one of 74 divisions around Queensland under the Divisional Boards Act 1879 with a population of 1738. The divisional offices were located in Toowoomba, Queensland, outside of the division.

With the passage of the Local Authorities Act 1902, Jondaryan Division became Shire of Jondaryan on 31 March 1903. Until 1960, the Shire's offices were located at Snell and Russell Streets, Toowoomba. Many of the council's original staff and councillors were associated with the Jondaryan Estates pastoral empire.

On 25 January 1913, the Shire of Gowrie was abolished and was split between the new Town of Newtown and the Shire of Jondaryan.

On 24 April 1913 the Millmerran and Pittsworth areas to its southwest seceded from the Shire of Jondaryan and separately incorporated as shires.

On 23 Feb 1917, the Town of Newtown was abolished, being split between the City of Toowoomba and the Shire of Jondaryan.

On 19 March 1949, Jondaryan received part of the former Shire of Drayton when it was abolished.

In 1960, the Shire's headquarters moved from Toowoomba (outside the shire) to the town of Oakey (within the shire).

On 15 March 2008, under the Local Government (Reform Implementation) Act 2007 passed by the Parliament of Queensland on 10 August 2007, the Shire of Jondaryan merged with the City of Toowoomba and the Shires of Cambooya, Clifton, Crows Nest, Millmerran, Pittsworth and Shire of Rosalie to form the Toowoomba Region.

Towns and localities
The Shire of Jondaryan includes the following settlements:

 Oakey
 Athol
 Aubigny
 Bowenville1
 Charlton1
 Cotswold Hills1
 Evanslea
 Glenvale2
 Gowrie Junction1, 2
 Gowrie Mountain
 Grassdale
 Jondaryan
 Kingsthorpe1
 Torrington2
 Wyreema3

1 - split with the former Shire of Rosalie
2 - split with the former City of Toowoomba
3 - split with the former Shire of Cambooya

Population

Chairmen and mayors
The Jondaryan Division and Shire had the following leaders:

Chairmen of Jondaryan Division
 1880-1892: James Taylor
 1892-1894: Francis Gore
 1894-1896: Gilbert Cory
 1896-1919: Charles Campbell

Chairmen of Jondaryan Shire
 1896-1919: Charles Campbell 
 1919-1945: William Kent
 1945-1955: Alan Paull
 1955-1959: Ernest Janetzki
 1959-1972: John Corfe
 1972-1973: Thomas Meehan
 1973-1985: Ian McIntyre
 1985-2008: Peter Taylor (mayor from 1993)

Peter Taylor was Jondaryan's final mayor, serving from 1985 until 2008. At the time of his first election he was the youngest Shire Chairman in Queensland. On 15 March 2008 he became the first mayor of the new Toowoomba Regional Council with 71.19% of the vote. Taylor was an executive member (Director) of the Local Government Association of Queensland (LGAQ) representing the Darling Downs, and was also director of the Board of LG Super, a statewide superannuation fund for all local government employees.

References

Former local government areas of Queensland
Darling Downs
Toowoomba
2008 disestablishments in Australia
Populated places disestablished in 2008